Cymindis circapicalis is a species of ground beetle in the subfamily Harpalinae. It was described by Kabak in 2006.

References

circapicalis
Beetles described in 2006